A coffeemaker, coffee maker or coffee machine is a cooking appliance used to brew coffee. While there are many different types of coffeemakers, the two most common brewing principles use gravity or pressure to move hot water through coffee grounds. In the most common devices, coffee grounds are placed into a paper or metal filter inside a funnel, which is set over a glass or ceramic coffee pot, a cooking pot in the kettle family. Cold water is poured into a separate chamber, which is then boiled and directed into the funnel and allowed to drip through the grounds under gravity. This is also called automatic drip-brew. Coffee makers that use pressure to force water through the coffee grounds are called espresso makers, and they produce espresso coffee.

Types

Vacuum brewers

On August 27, 1930, Inez H. Peirce of Chicago, Illinois, filed her patent for the first vacuum coffee maker that truly automated the vacuum brewing process, while eliminating the need for a stovetop burner or liquid fuels.

Cafetiere 
A cafetiere (coffee plunger, French press in US English) requires coffee of a coarser grind than does a drip brew coffee filter, as finer grounds will seep through the press filter and into the coffee.

Because the coffee grounds remain in direct contact with the brewing water and the grounds are filtered from the water via a mesh instead of a paper filter, coffee brewed with the cafetiere captures more of the coffee's flavour and essential oils, which would become trapped in a traditional drip brew machine's paper filters.  As with drip-brewed coffee, cafetiere coffee can be brewed to any strength by adjusting the amount of ground coffee which is brewed. If the used grounds remain in the drink after brewing, French pressed coffee left to stand can become "bitter", though this is an effect that many users of cafetiere consider beneficial. For a  cafetiere, the contents are considered spoiled, by some reports, after around 20 minutes.

Single-serve coffeemaker 
The single-serve or single-cup coffeemaker had gained popularity by the 2000s.

See also 

 Benjamin Thompson
 Caffè crema
 Cezve
 Coffee cup
Coffee percolator
 Coffee pod
 Coffee preparation
 Coffee vending machine
 Coffeepot (François-Thomas Germain)
 ISSpresso – the first espresso coffee machine designed for use in space
 Jebena
 Moka pot
 Neapolitan flip coffee pot
 Trojan Room coffee pot

References

External links
 

Coffeeware
Cooking appliances
Boilers (cookware)
American culture
18th-century inventions